The PBA on GTV, later the PBA on MBS was a presentation of Philippine Basketball Association games by Media Specialists, Inc. on Government Television later became Maharlika Broadcasting System in 1980.

Commentators/Analysts

Play by play
 Dick Ildefonso

Analysts
 Emy Arcilla
 Zal Marte
 Lauro Mumar

See also
Philippine Basketball Association
List of programs aired by People's Television Network

MBS
People's Television Network original programming
1978 Philippine television series debuts
1981 Philippine television series endings
Philippine sports television series
1970s Philippine television series
1980s Philippine television series

ceb:PBA on MBS